Bernardo O'Connor y Ophaly, Spanish-Irish General, (Strasbourg, 1696 – 1780).  First Count of Ofalia in 1776 by King Charles III of Spain in remembrance of the Baronetcy of Ophaly, County Kildare, Ireland, where his family came from. He was a military governor of Tortosa, Pamplona and Barcelona. He was also Captain General of Castilla la Vieja and Captain General of Granada. He had no family issue.

The title was inherited by Felix Maria de Salabert O'Brien-O'Connor Ophaly, born about 1775, the son of a grand niece of this Bernard O'Connor, daughter of an O'Brien, Spanish-Irish Colonel of Dragoons and an Isabel O'Connor Ophaly woman, related to Bernardo, perhaps a niece.

Felix Maria de Salabert was on his own right, 5th Marqués de la Torrecilla de Valmadrid, title by King Charles II of Spain awarded on 25 September 1688 in and 6th Marqués de Valdeolmos, title awarded also by King Charles II of Spain on 3 July 1687.

He came from an Aragonese family named Salabert and females from the Aguerri-Churruca Navarrese branch, majors of the town of Madrid, all of them, with very wealthy family backgrounds indeed.

Both Spanish General O'Connor and Spanish Dragoons Colonel O'Brien were the result of what is usually described in Irish history as the Flight of the Wild Geese at the end of the 17th century.

Wild Geese (soldiers)
18th-century Irish people
Military personnel from Strasbourg
French people of Irish descent
French expatriates in Spain
Irish expatriates in Spain
Irish soldiers in the Spanish Army
1696 births
1780 deaths